Hazleton long barrows, known as Hazleton North and Hazleton South, are the remains of Neolithic barrows or cairns of the Cotswold-Severn Group, located close to the village of Hazleton in Gloucestershire, South West England.

Archaeology
Hazleton North was excavated over several years, from 1979 to 1982, under the direction of Alan Saville. The barrow was completely excavated, so all that remains of it are the now backfilled and below-ground quarry pits on the northern and southern sides of the barrow. In 2020 one of the Hazleton North burial chambers, built of limestone orthostats, was reconstructed as a new display at Corinium Museum in Cirencester.

In 2021, archaeologists from the universities of Newcastle, Central Lancashire, Exeter and York, and geneticists from the universities of Harvard, Vienna, and the Basque country published the results of the examination of the bones and teeth of 35 people buried in Hazleton North. The research team discovered that 27 were biological relatives from five continuous generations of a single extended family.

See also
 Cotswold-Severn Group of long barrows 
 List of long barrows in the United Kingdom

References

Sources
 
 
 
 
 

Stone Age sites in England
Barrows in England
Archaeological sites in Gloucestershire
English Heritage sites in Gloucestershire